The Chaytor family is an English gentry family on which has been conferred two  baronetcies, one in the Baronetage of England and one in the Baronetage of the United Kingdom and several knighthoods. As of 2008 one baronetcy is extinct.

The Chaytor Baronetcy, of Croft Hall in the County of York, was created in the Baronetage of England on 26 June 1671 for William Chaytor, colonel of the Richmondshire Regiment of the militia in 1689. He was the son of Royalist Lieutenant-Colonel Nicholas Chaytor (1608 – 1665), of Butterby and Haughton Field. In 1675, Sir William married Peregrina, daughter of Sir Joseph Cradock of Richmond. Though Sir William had eight sons and five daughters, none of them survived him, and when he died in Fleet Prison, where he had been held for debt 17 years, in 1720/1 the baronetcy became extinct. His seat of Croft passed to his nephew Henry, who was father of William Chaytor (MP) of Croft and Spenningthorne (1732 – 1819).

The Chaytor Baronetcy, of Croft in the County of York and of Witton Castle in the County of Durham, was created in the Baronetage of the United Kingdom on 30 September 1831 for William Chaytor, an industrialist and Whig politician who served as MP for Richmond in the first Reform Parliament. He built Clervaux Castle on the manor of Croft. He was son of William Chaytor of Croft and Spenningthorne, Member of Parliament for Hedon (UK Parliament constituency), Recorder of Richmond and Vice-Lieutenant for the North Riding of Yorkshire; his great-grandfather, Henry Chaytor (c. 1638 – 1719) was brother to Sir William Chaytor, 1st Baronet of the first creation.

He was succeeded by his eldest son William Richard Carter Chaytor, the second baronet, who represented Durham in the House of Commons. His grandson, William Henry Edward Chaytor, the fourth baronet, was High Sheriff of County Durham in 1902 and a Deputy Lieutenant of the county. He died unmarried at an early age and was succeeded by his younger brother, Walter Clervaux Chaytor, the fifth baronet, who served as a Justice of the Peace. The fifth baronet also died at a young age and was succeeded by his younger brother, Edmund Hugh Chaytor, the sixth baronet. On the death of his only son, William Henry Clervaux Chaytor, the seventh Baronet, in 1976, the line of the third baronet failed. The presumed eighth baronet, his successor, was his second cousin George Reginald Chaytor, son of William Richard Carter Chaytor, eldest son of Reginald Clervaux Chaytor, son of the second marriage of the second baronet. He never proved his succession and was never on the Official Roll of the Baronetage. As of 2019, the presumed ninth baronet was his first cousin once removed, Bruce Gordon Chaytor.

Major-General Sir Edward Chaytor, commander of New Zealand troops in the Boer War and First World War, was the grandson of John Clervaux Chaytor, second son of the first baronet.

Chaytor baronets, of Croft Hall (1671)
Sir William Chaytor, 1st Baronet (1639–1721)

Chaytor baronets, of Witton Castle and Croft (1831)
Sir William Chaytor, 1st Baronet (1771–1847)
Sir William Richard Carter Chaytor, 2nd Baronet (1805–1871)
Sir William Chaytor, 3rd Baronet (1837–1896)
Sir William Henry Edward Chaytor, 4th Baronet (1867–1908)
Sir Walter Clervaux Chaytor, 5th Baronet (1874–1913)
Sir Edmund Hugh Chaytor, 6th Baronet (1876–1935)
Sir William Henry Clervaux Chaytor, 7th Baronet (1914–1976)
George Reginald Chaytor, presumed 8th Baronet (1912–1999)
Bruce Gordon Chaytor, presumed 9th Baronet (born 1949)

The heir apparent to the presumed 9th Baronet is his only son, John Gordon Chaytor (born 1973).

Notes

References

Hylton Longstaffe, William. The House of Clervaux, Its Descents and Alliances. G. Bouchier Richardson, Newcastle upon Tyne, 1852.
Kidd, Charles, Williamson, David (editors). Debrett's Peerage and Baronetage (1990 edition). New York: St Martin's Press, 1990.
Mosley, Charles, ed., Burke's Peerage, Baronetage and Knightage, 107th edition, vol. I, 2003

Baronetcies in the Baronetage of the United Kingdom
Dormant baronetcies
Extinct baronetcies in the Baronetage of England